The 2000 House elections in Washington occurred on November 7, 2000, to elect the members of the State of Washington's delegation to the United States House of Representatives. Washington has nine seats in the House, apportioned according to the 1990 United States Census. This election saw the Democrats flip one Republican-held open seat. These elections occurred alongside Al Gore's victory in the state over George W. Bush in the Presidential election.

Overview

District 1 

Incumbent Democratic Congressman Jay Inslee ran for a fourth non-consecutive term in Congress from this fairly liberal district rooted in portions of the Kitsap Peninsula and Seattle’s northern suburbs. Inslee faced Republican candidate, State Senator Dan McDonald, winning re-election by a wide margin.

District 2 

Incumbent Republican Congressman Jack Metcalf retired instead of seeking a fourth term. The open seat pitted Republican John Koster, a member of the Washington House of Representatives against Democrat Rick Larsen, a member of the Snohomish County Council. Larsen won the election flipping the seat from Republican to Democrat, although by a very slim majority of the vote.

District 3 

Though the Southwest Washington-based district that two-term Democratic incumbent Congressman Brian Baird represented was essentially a centrist district, he was able to beat challenger Trent R. Matson by a wide margin.

District 4 

In the solidly conservative, central Washington congressional district, incumbent Republican Congressman Doc Hastings faced Democrat Jim Davis. Owing to Hastings’s popularity and his district’s strong proclivity towards electing Republican candidates, he was yet again re-elected in a landslide.

District 5 

Incumbent Republican Congressman George Nethercutt easily won a fourth term in Congress facing off against Democratic candidate Tom Keefe and Libertarian candidate Greg Holmes as obstacles to another term. In this staunchly conservative district rooted in the socially conservative counties of eastern Washington, the 5th district had been represented by former speaker of the House Tom Foley until his defeat in 1994 by Nethercutt.

District 6 

Long-serving Democratic Congressman Norm Dicks, the longest-serving of Washington congressmen, has represented this liberal-leaning, Kitsap Peninsula-based district since he was first elected in 1976. Congressman Dicks faced Air Force veteran and Republican nominee Bob Lawrence in the general election. Lawrence was defeated in a landslide margin by Dicks.

District 7 

This district, the most liberal in Washington, encompasses most of the city of Seattle and has been represented by Democratic Congressman Jim McDermott since he was first elected in 1988. Running for a seventh term, McDermott was challenged by Green Party candidate Joe Szwaja and Libertarian Joel Gruzs, the Republicans did not field a candidate in this race. McDermott easily won re-election defeating both the Green and Libertarian candidates by a landslide margin.

District 8 

Incumbent Republican Congresswoman Jennifer Dunn ran for a fifth term in this liberal-leaning district and faced Democratic nominee Heidi Behrens-Benedict and Libertarian Bernard Mcllroy in the general election. The general election was a rematch between Gunn and Behrens-Benedict. Despite the 8th district, based in the eastern Seattle suburbs, having voted for Al Gore by a slim margin, Dunn won a fifth term by a wide margin.

District 9 

Running for a third term, incumbent Democratic Congressman Adam Smith was opposed by Republican, King County Councilmember Chris Vance and Libertarian candidate Jonathan V. Wright in the general election. Congressman Smith represents a liberal-leaning district that runs from the state’s capital of Olympia to some of the southern suburbs of Seattle, Smith won by a wide margin.

References 

United States House of Representatives elections in Washington (state)
2000 in American politics